Edward Vincent Donnelly (December 10, 1932 – December 25, 1992) was a right-handed pitcher in Major League Baseball (MLB) for the Chicago Cubs.

Baseball career
Donnelly was signed as a free agent by the Kansas City Athletics before the 1956 season and was assigned to the Abilene Blue Sox. The Athletics either sold or traded his rights to the Cubs in June, and he made two more minor league stops in Ponca City and Lafayette. In the 1957–59 seasons, Donnelly worked his way through the system, toiling for Burlington and Fort Worth as well, before finally earning a promotion to the Cubs in the second half of the 1959 season.

Donnelly's major league debut came on August 1 in mop-up duty against the Cincinnati Reds. Cubs starter Glen Hobbie and reliever John Buzhardt had combined to surrender 10 runs in 4 innings of work. He induced the first batter the faced, Roy McMillan, to ground out to third base, and struck out Eddie Kasko for the second out, his first major league strikeout. The next batter was opposing pitcher Bob Purkey, who doubled for the first hit Donnelly surrendered in the big leagues, but he escaped the inning without giving up a run. Though he had surrender two runs (one earned) in the next inning, his debut was decent—three innings, five hits, a walk, two runs (one earned), two strikeouts. That first outing would also prove to be the longest of his major league career.

Donnelly lost his third appearance before earning his first (and only) major league victory in his fourth. He was summoned to relieve Buzhardt again after the Cubs had fallen behind 7–6 through three innings. Donnelly gave up a hit and a walk, but no runs. The Cubs scored four runs in the bottom of that inning and never surrendered the lead, cruising to a 20–9 victory.

In Donnelly's final big league appearance (September 20), he threw a scoreless eighth inning as the Cubs fell to the St. Louis Cardinals. Donnelly spent the next two seasons with the Cubs' AAA affiliate, the Houston Buffs, going a combined 15–10 in 101 games (100 relief appearances, 1 start) with ERAs of 3.00 and 3.36.

Nevertheless, Donnelly was released by the Cubs, and spent 1962 and 1963 with Dallas-Fort Worth of the Pacific Coast League and Syracuse in the International League. He retired after the 1963 season, at age 30.

Personal life
Donnelly died on December 25, 1992, in Houston, Texas. He is buried in Weimar, Texas, in St. Michael Catholic Cemetery. Two of Donnelly's grandsons, brothers Jarred Cosart and Jake Cosart, have also played professional baseball.

References

External links

1932 births
1992 deaths
Baseball players from Michigan
Chicago Cubs players
Lafayette Oilers players
Abilene Blue Sox players
Ponca City Cubs players
Burlington Bees players
Houston Buffs players
Syracuse Chiefs players
Dallas Rangers players
Major League Baseball pitchers